Grimmest Hits is the tenth studio album by American heavy metal band Black Label Society. The album was released on January 19, 2018. According to AllMusic, the sound of the album was inspired by Black Sabbath and Led Zeppelin. Zakk Wylde admitted in an interview with Billboard that he "just wanted to confuse people", regarding its title.

The album reached No. 1 on the Billboard Hard Music, No. 1 Independent, and No. 2 Rock Charts. The album was also the No. 1 selling album at Best Buy for the week of its release, beating out Grammy-nominated Fall Out Boy by a considerable margin. Upon its release, the album landed at #1 spot on iTunes Top Rock Albums Chart and No. 7 on the Overall Top Albums Chart.

Promotion
In Spring 2018, Black Label Society collaborated with Corrosion of Conformity, Eyehategod, and Red Fang to promote Grimmest Hits album. On February 26, 2020, the band performed Grimmest Hits at the North American Crusade tour in Tucson, Arizona.

Reception

Blabbermouth.net called Grimmest Hits a "partial excuse" for Zakk Wylde to show his affection for Ozzy [Ozbourne] and Black Sabbath.

Blair K. Rose of All About the Rock said that Grimmest Hits "carries on the torch rather proudly". The Moshville Times said that the album "doesn't reinvent the Black Label Society wheel", and mentioning that "it's not their finest hour". Martien Koolen called Grimmest Hits "Black Label Society's best album".

Track listing

Personnel
Zakk Wylde – guitars, vocals, piano, acoustic guitar
John DeServio – bass
Jeff Fabb – drums

Charts

References

2018 albums
Black Label Society albums
MNRK Music Group albums